The 2017 mayoral election in Jackson, Mississippi took place on June 6, 2017, alongside other Jackson municipal races. Chokwe Antar Lumumba, son of late former mayor Chokwe Lumumba was elected mayor in a landslide in the general election after defeating eight other candidates, including incumbent mayor Tony Yarber in the primary.

Results

References

2017 United States mayoral elections
Mayoral elections in Jackson, Mississippi